The 28th Annual Tony Awards ceremony was held on April 21, 1974, at the Shubert Theatre in New York City, and broadcast by ABC television. Hosts were Peter Falk, Florence Henderson, Robert Preston and Cicely Tyson. The theme was "Homecoming", where stars from TV and film returned to Broadway to help present the awards or perform.

The ceremony
Presenters: Alan Alda, Ed Asner, Karen Black, David Carradine, Johnny Carson, Bette Davis, Peter Falk, Henry Fonda, Elliott Gould, Ken Howard, Glynis Johns, Cloris Leachman, Michael Learned, Elizabeth Montgomery, Carroll O'Connor, Al Pacino, Suzanne Pleshette, Jane Powell, Lynn Redgrave, Esther Rolle, Marlo Thomas, Lesley Ann Warren.

Performers: Beatrice Arthur, Carol Channing, Will Geer, Joel Grey, Florence Henderson, Cleavon Little, Charles Nelson Reilly, Nancy Walker.

Musicals represented:
 Over Here! ("Over Here"/"Charlie's Place" - Patty and Maxene Andrews and Company)
 Raisin ("Whole Lot of Sunshine" - Virginia Capers/"Sidewalk Tree" - Ralph Carter)
 Lorelei ("Men" - Carol Channing, Peter Palmer and Ian Tucker)
 Good News ("You're the Cream in My Coffee" - Alice Faye and John Payne)
 Seesaw ("I'm Way ahead"/"Seesaw" - Michele Lee)
 Fanny ("Welcome Home" - Florence Henderson)
 A Mother's Kisses ("There Goes My Life" - Bea Arthur)
 Medley of Songs from Broadway Shows - Charles Nelson Reilly
 The Cradle Will Rock (Medley - Will Geer)
 George M! (Medley - Joel Grey)
 Phoenix '55 ("Upper Berth" - Nancy Walker and Men)
 Purlie ("New Fangled Preacher Man" - Cleavon Little)

Winners and nominees
Winners are in bold

Special Tony awards
Liza Minnelli, for adding lustre to the Broadway season
Bette Midler, for adding lustre to the Broadway season
Peter Cook and Dudley Moore, co-stars and authors of Good Evening
A Moon for the Misbegotten, an outstanding dramatic revival of an American classic. Produced by Lester Osterman, Elliott Martin and Richard Hurner
Candide, an outstanding contribution to the artistic development of the musical theatre. Produced by Chelsea Theatre Group, Harold Prince and Ruth Mitchell
Actors' Equity Association
Theatre Development Fund
John F. Wharton, veteran theatrical attorney
Harold Friedlander, the industry's foremost printing expert

Multiple nominations and awards

These productions had multiple nominations:

9 nominations: Raisin 
8 nominations: Candide 
7 nominations: Seesaw
6 nominations: A Moon for the Misbegotten and Ulysses in Nighttown  
5 nominations: Over Here!  
4 nominations: The Au Pair Man, Gigi and The Good Doctor 
3 nominations: Chemin de Fer, Find Your Way Home, In the Boom Boom Room, The River Niger and Uncle Vanya  
2 nominations: Cyrano, The Visit and What the Wine-Sellers Buy    

The following productions received multiple awards.

5 wins: Candide
4 wins: A Moon for the Misbegotten  
2 wins: Raisin and Seesaw

External links
Tony Awards Official Site

Tony Awards ceremonies
1974 in theatre
1974 awards
Tony
1974 in New York City
1970s in Manhattan